This is a list of non-marine molluscs of Iraq.

Freshwater gastropods
Neritidae
 Theodoxus jordani (Sowerby, 1844)

Assimineidae
 Assiminea mesopotamica Glöer, Naser & Yasser, 2007
 Assiminea zubairensis Glöer  & Naser, 2013

Bithyniidae
 Bithynia hareerensis Glöer & Naser, 2008

Viviparidae
 Bellamya bengalensis (Lamarck, 1822)

Melanopsidae
 Melanopsis buccinoidea Olivier, 1801
 Melanopsis costata (Olivier, 1804)
 Melanopsis nodosa A. Férussac, 1822

Thiaridae
 Melanoides tuberculata (O. F. Müller, 1774)

Lymnaeidae
 Lymnaea auricularia (Linnaeus, 1758)

Physidae
 Physella acuta (Draparnaud, 1805)

Planorbidae
 Bulinus truncatus (Audouin, 1827)
 Gyraulus huwaizahensis Glöer & Naser, 2005

Land gastropods
Orculidae
 Orculella palatalis (Pilsbry, 1922)
 Orculella sirianocoriensis libanotica (Tristram, 1865)

Helicidae
 Eobania vermiculata (O. F. Müller, 1774)

Freshwater bivalves
 Sinanodonta woodiana (Lea, 1834)

See also
Lists of non-marine molluscs of surrounding countries:
 List of non-marine molluscs of Turkey
 List of non-marine molluscs of Iran
 List of non-marine molluscs of Jordan

References

Molluscs
Iraq